Mohamed Sharaf El-Din (born December 23, 1974) is an Egyptian handball player. He competed for Egypt's national team at the 2000 and 2004 Summer Olympics.

References 

1975 births
Living people
Egyptian male handball players
Olympic handball players of Egypt
Handball players at the 2000 Summer Olympics
Handball players at the 2004 Summer Olympics